The most successful teams, as of 2016, have been: Brazil, 11 times (1994, 1996, 1998, 2004, 2005, 2006, 2008, 2009, 2013, 2014, 2016); and United States, 6 times (1995, 2001, 2010, 2011, 2012, 2015). The competition has been won 3 times by Russia (1997, 1999, 2002), twice by Cuba (1993, 2000) and once by China (2003) and the Netherlands (2007).

References

External links
Honours (1993–2016)

Statistics
Volleyball records and statistics